Martin George Scharlemann (born 6 December 1948) is an American topologist who is a professor at the University of California, Santa Barbara. He obtained his Ph.D. from the University of California, Berkeley under the guidance of Robion Kirby in 1974.

A conference in his honor was held in 2009 at the University of California, Davis. He is a Fellow of the American Mathematical Society, for his "contributions to low-dimensional topology and knot theory."

Abigail Thompson was a student of his. Together they solved the graph planarity problem:  There is
an algorithm to decide whether a finite graph in 3-space can be moved in 3-space into a plane.

He gave the first proof of the classical theorem that knots with unknotting number one are prime. He used hard combinatorial arguments for this. Simpler proofs are now known.

Selected publications

"Producing reducible 3-manifolds by surgery on a knot" Topology 29 (1990), no. 4, 481–500. 
with Abigail Thompson, "Heegaard splittings of (surface) x I are standard" Mathematische Annalen 295 (1993), no. 3, 549–564. 
"Sutured manifolds and generalized Thurston norms", Journal of Differential Geometry 29 (1989), no. 3, 557–614. 
with J. Hyam Rubinstein, "Comparing Heegaard splittings of non-Haken 3-manifolds" Topology  35 (1996), no. 4, 1005–1026
"Unknotting number one knots are prime", Inventiones mathematicae 82 (1985), no. 1, 37–55. 
with Maggy Tomova,  "Alternate Heegaard genus bounds distance" Geometry & Topology 10 (2006), 593–617. 
"Local detection of strongly irreducible Heegaard splittings" Topology and its Applications, 1998
with Abigail Thompson – "Link genus and the Conway moves" Commentarii Mathematici Helvetici, 1989
"Tunnel number one knots satisfy the Poenaru conjecture" Topology and its Applications, 1984
with A Thompson – "Detecting unknotted graphs in 3-space" Journal of Differential Geometry, 1991
with A Thompson – "Thin position and Heegaard splittings of the 3-sphere" J. Differential Geom, 1994

References

Topologists
1948 births
Living people
University of California, Santa Barbara faculty
Fellows of the American Mathematical Society
20th-century American mathematicians
21st-century American mathematicians
University of California, Berkeley alumni